An atriphtaloid, also called an atriphtothlassic curve, is type of sextic plane curve. It is given by the equation

where a and b are positive numbers.

References 
 

Sextic curves